Aguas Calientes is the name of two rivers in Venezuela:
 Aguas Calientes River (Carabobo)
 Aguas Calientes River (Sucre)

See also
 Agua Caliente (disambiguation)